The 1958 Columbia Lions football team was an American football team that represented Columbia University as a member of the Ivy League during the 1958 NCAA University Division football season. 

In their second season under head coach Aldo "Buff" Donelli, the Lions compiled a 1–8 record and were outscored 291 to 35. Coy Gobble was the team captain.  

The Lions' 1–6 conference record placed seventh in the Ivy League. Columbia was outscored 196 to 21 by Ivy opponents. 

Columbia played its home games at Baker Field in Upper Manhattan, in New York City.

Schedule

References

Columbia
Columbia Lions football seasons
Columbia Lions football